Harworth Colliery Football Club is an English football club based in Harworth and Bircotes, Nottinghamshire.

History
The club was formed as Harworth Colliery Institute in 1931 and initially played in local leagues before joining the Yorkshire League after the Second World War, remaining in that League until the Northern Counties East League was formed in 1982. Harworth spent four years in that league before joining the Central Midlands League as a founder member of the Supreme Division. Runners-up in the first season, Harworth Colliery was top in the following season. The club was relegated to the Premier Division in 2001 before being placed back in the Supreme Division when the League was reorganised.

In the 1979–80 season, the club reached the third round of the FA Vase competition. Harworth has also competed in the FA Cup but has never progressed past the second qualifying round.

After a few shaky years in the Central Midlands Division One finishing in the lower regions of the league the club took the opportunity to be promoted to the Supreme Division for the 2008–09 season. The team was top of the league for the majority of the season, but with injuries and suspensions towards the end of the season the team finished in seventh place. After the season, the manager Mark Brogan stepped down after two years in charge.

Season-by-season record

Honours
Sheffield and Hallamshire Senior Cup
Winners 1947–48
Runners-up 1948–49, 1996–97
Central Midlands Football League Supreme Division
Champions 1987–88
Runners-up 1986–87
Sheffield and Hallamshire County Senior Football League
Champions 1964–65, 1976–77

Records
FA Cup
 Second qualifying round 1988–89
FA Vase
 Third round 1979–80

References

External links
 Harworth Colliery Institute official website

Football clubs in England
Football clubs in Nottinghamshire
Association football clubs established in 1931
1931 establishments in England
Sheffield & Hallamshire County FA members
Doncaster & District Senior League
Yorkshire Football League
Sheffield Association League
Northern Counties East Football League
Central Midlands Football League
Mining association football teams in England